Fort Wayne, Indiana, is home to several sports teams. These include the NBA's Fort Wayne Pistons (now in Detroit), the Fort Wayne Daisies of the All-American Girls Professional Baseball League, and the Fort Wayne Kekiongas of the National Association of Professional Baseball

History

Fort Wayne has been home to a few sports firsts. On June 2, 1883, Fort Wayne hosted the Quincy Professionals for one of the first lighted baseball games ever recorded. Fort Wayne has been credited for being the birthplace of the NBA when Fort Wayne Pistons owner Fred Zollner brokered the merger of the BAA and the NBL in 1949 from his kitchen table. Also, on March 10, 1961, Wilt Chamberlain became the first player in the NBA to reach 3,000 points in a single season while competing at Memorial Coliseum.

Fort Wayne hosted two NBA Finals Games in 1955 and 1956, as well as the third city to host the NBA All-Star Game in 1953. The Allen County War Memorial Coliseum was also venue to the 2000 NCAA Men's Division I Volleyball Championship matches, in addition to hosting the 2000, 2001, and 2002 Mid-Continent Conference men's basketball tournaments. Fort Wayne also annually hosts the U.S.S.S.A. National and Boys State Championships, held at Spiece Fieldhouse.

On November 22, 1950, the Fort Wayne Pistons defeated the Minneapolis Lakers with a final score of 19 to 18 in the lowest scoring game in NBA history.

Fort Wayne hosted another major league team in a Big Four sport, the Fort Wayne Kekiongas of the National Association. The National Association was the first professional baseball league and the forerunner of the National League; it is sometimes considered to have been a major league, and sometimes not. The Kekiongas were a founding member of the national association (in 1871), and played and won the first National Association game, but disbanded partway through the 1871 season.

Wildcat Baseball League was a baseball league in  Fort Wayne formed by Dale McMillen in April 1960 as an alternative to Little League Baseball.
Fort Wayne was rated the "Best Place in the Country for Minor League Sports" in a 2007 issue of Street & Smith's Sports Business Journal.

Current sports teams

Former sports teams

Notable natives and former residents

Athletes

Professional baseball 

 Rob Bowen, MLB (2003–2008) Minnesota Twins,  San Diego Padres,  Chicago Cubs, Oakland Athletics
 Dottie Collins, AAGPBL (1944–1950) Minneapolis Millerettes, Fort Wayne Daisies
 David Doster, MLB (1996, 1999) Philadelphia Phillies
 Bill Everitt, MLB (1895–1901) Chicago Colts/Orphans,  Washington Senators
 Louie Heilbroner,  manager,  MLB (1900) St. Louis Cardinals
 Butch Henline, MLB (1921–1931) New York Giants,  Philadelphia Phillies,  Brooklyn Robins,  Chicago White Sox
 Ralph Miller, MLB (1920–1924) Philadelphia Phillies,  Washington Senators
 Eric Wedge, player, MLB (1991–1994) Boston Red Sox,  Colorado Rockies;  manager, MLB (2003–2009) Cleveland Indians and Seattle Mariners
 Kevin Kiermaier, MLB (2013-present day) Tampa Bay Rays
 Jarrod Parker, MLB (2011-present day) Arizona Diamondbacks, Oakland Athletics

Professional basketball 
 Paul "Curly" Armstrong, NBA (1948/49-1950/51) Fort Wayne Pistons
 Dan Godfread, NBA (1990/91-1991/92) Minnesota Timberwolves,  Houston Rockets
 Ralph Albert "Ham" Hamilton, NBA (1948/49) Fort Wayne Pistons
 Henry James, NBA (1990/91-1997/98) Cleveland Cavaliers,  Utah Jazz,  Sacramento Kings,  Los Angeles Clippers, Houston Rockets,  Atlanta Hawks
 Bobby Milton, player and manager of Harlem Globetrotters
 Brad Miller, NBA (1998/99-present) Charlotte Hornets,  Chicago Bulls,  Indiana Pacers,  Sacramento Kings
 Bill Roberts, NBA (1948/49-1949/50) Chicago Stags, Boston Celtics, St. Louis Bombers
 George Yardley, NBA (1953/54-1959/60) Fort Wayne Pistons/Detroit Pistons
 Tiffany Gooden, ABL (1998), Colorado Xplosion
 Caleb Swanigan, NBA (2017/18-present) Portland Trail Blazers

Professional BMX
 Barry McManus,  BMX racer in 1980-'90s
 Scott Yoquelet, BMX racer in 1990–2000s
 Joey Marks, BMX dirt freestyle 1998–2010
 Brian Doty, BMX racer 1980-'90s

Professional football

Mike Augustyniak, NFL (1981–1983) New York Jets 
 Jason Baker, NFL (2001–2012) San Francisco 49ers, Philadelphia Eagles, Kansas City Chiefs, Indianapolis Colts, Denver Broncos, Carolina Panthers
 Roosevelt Barnes, NFL (1982–1985) Detroit Lions 
 Bill Boedeker, NFL (1946–1950) Chicago Rockets, Cleveland Browns, Philadelphia Eagles, Green Bay Packers
 Johnny Bright, CFL (1952–1964) Calgary Stampeders, Edmonton Eskimos,  subject of the "Johnny Bright Incident"
 Bob Cowan, NFL (1947–1949) Cleveland Browns, Baltimore Colts
John Diettrich, NFL (1987)Houston Oilers
 Vaughn Dunbar, NFL (1992–1995) New Orleans Saints,  Jacksonville Jaguars
 Tyler Eifert, NFL (2013–present) Cincinnati Bengals 
 Eric England, NFL (1994–1996) Arizona Cardinals
 Trai Essex, NFL (2005–2012) Pittsburgh Steelers,  Super Bowl XL champion, Indianapolis Colts
 Jason Fabini, NFL (1998–2008) New York Jets, Dallas Cowboys, Washington Redskins
 James Hardy, NFL (2008–2011) Buffalo Bills, Baltimore Ravens
 Selwyn Lymon, NFL (no professional games played) Miami Dolphins
 Le'Ron McClain, NFL (2007–2013) Baltimore Ravens, Kansas City Chiefs, San Diego Chargers
 Bernard Pollard, NFL (2006–2014) Kansas City Chiefs,  Houston Texans, Baltimore Ravens, Tennessee Titans
 Emil Sitko, NFL (1950–1952) San Francisco 49ers,  Chicago Cardinals
 Lamar Smith, NFL (1994–2003) Seattle Seahawks,  New Orleans Saints,  Miami Dolphins,  Carolina Panthers
 Anthony Spencer, NFL (2007–2015) Dallas Cowboys, New Orleans Saints
 Rod Woodson, NFL (1987–2003) Pittsburgh Steelers, San Francisco 49ers, Baltimore Ravens, Oakland Raiders, Pro Football Hall of Famer
 Rod Smith, NFL (2015-present) Seattle Seahawks, Dallas Cowboys
 Jaylon Smith, NFL (2016-present) Dallas Cowboys

Professional golf
 Amanda Blumenherst
 Billy Kratzert,  golfer and  sportcaster
 Cathy Kratzert Gerring

Professional hockey
 Dale Purinton, NHL (1999/2000–2003/04) New York Rangers

Martial arts
 Adam Bobay, UFC
 Jon Fitch, UFC
 Dave Herman,  MMA fighter with EliteXC (Elite Xtreme Combat)

Professional soccer
 DaMarcus Beasley, Rangers F.C. of the Scottish Premier League,  U.S. national team,  MLS Chicago Fire
 Jamar Beasley, MLS New England Revolution, Chicago Fire
 Bronn Pfeiffer, Fort Wayne Flames, Indiana Kicks, Chicago Power, and Detroit Rockers in the National Professional Soccer League.
 Mike Harper, Baton Rouge Bombers of the Eastern Indoor Soccer League.

Olympic swimming and diving
 Steve Bigelow,  swimmer,  1988 Summer Olympics
 Mark Virts,  diver,  participated in boycott of the 1980 Summer Olympics led by President Jimmy Carter
 Matt Vogel,  swimmer,  two-time Olympic gold medalist,  1976 Summer Olympics
 Sharon Wichman,  swimmer,  Olympic gold medalist,  1968 Summer Olympics
 Dan Zehr,  swimmer,  1932 Summer Olympics

Olympic track and field
 LeShundra "DeDee" Nathan,  2000 Summer Olympics

Professional volleyball
 Angie Akers, professional beach volleyball player
 Lloy Ball, Olympic gold medalist,  2008 Summer Olympics

Other notable individuals
 Eugene E. Parker,  sports agent,  45th in "Sports Illustrated"'s 101 most influential minorities in sports
 Art Smith,  aviator,  invented "loop the loop" 
 Jessie Lopez, US National Rugby Union Team, 1978

Northeast Indiana's Top 50 Athletes 
The News-Sentinel's Northeast Indiana's Top 50 Athletes of the 20th century are:
 Rod Woodson
 Johnny Bright
 George Yardley
 Everett Scott
 Len Thornson
 Bobby McDermott
 Don Lash
 DeDee Nathan
 Lloy Ball
 Cathy Gerring
 Bill Kratzert
 Matt Vogel
 Sharon (Wichman) Jones
 Emil Sitko
 Eugene "Bubbles" Hargrave
 Dottie Wiltse Collins
 Willie Long
 Ivan Acosta
 Eddie Long
 Paul "Curly" Armstrong
 Bill Wambsganss
 MaChelle Joseph
 Steve Hargan
 Henry James
 Gene Hartley
 Bill West
 Bernie Kampschmidt
 Joanne Weaver
 Herm Schaefer
 Lionel Repka
 Vaughn Dunbar
 Walter Jordan
 Bruce Miller
 Lashanda Harper
 Nel Fettig
 Terry Pembroke
 Steve Platt
 Tom Beerman
 Cathey Tyree
 Jason Fabini
 Tiffany Gooden
 Lamar Smith
 Leslie Johnson
 Tom Bolyard
 Roosevelt Barnes
 Conan Myers
 Lee Ann Reed
 Tom Kelley
 Mike Augustyniak
 Colin Chin

See also
 Fort Wayne Open

References

Fort Wayne